The  was an infantry division of the Imperial Japanese Army. Its call sign was the 

The Imperial Japanese Army (IJA) 42nd Division was raised as a triangular division (type B, standard) on 1 June 1943 in Sendai, simultaneously with 43rd, 46th and 47th divisions. It was assigned 16 March 1944 to 27th army. An Itarkioi and Ketoebone detachments from 42nd division have engaged in garrison duties at Simushir island (in Kuril Islands). The 12th field artillery regiment was detached from the 42nd division in May 1944.

As the 27th army was abolished 1 February 1945, the 42nd division was transferred to Hokkaido and submitted directly to 5th area army.

In July 1945, several thousands of personnel were detached to form other military units. While digging in at Wakkanai, Hokkaido to oppose a possible Soviet invasion from Sakhalin across the La Perouse Strait, the 42nd division met the surrender of Japan 15 August 1945 without engaging in any combat, and was disbanded in September 1945.

See also
 List of Japanese Infantry Divisions
 Independent Mixed Brigades (Imperial Japanese Army)
 Organization of Kita and Minami Fortresses

Notes and references
 Madej, W. Victor. Japanese Armed Forces Order of Battle, 1937-1945 [2 vols]
Allentown, PA: 1981
 秦郁彦編『日本陸海軍総合事典』第2版、東京大学出版会、2005年。
 外山操・森松俊夫編著『帝国陸軍編制総覧』芙蓉書房出版、1987年。
 示村貞夫『旭川第七師団』総北海出版部、1984年

Japanese World War II divisions
Military units and formations established in 1943
Military units and formations disestablished in 1945
Infantry divisions of Japan
1943 establishments in Japan
1945 disestablishments in Japan